Rangrazan-e Sofla (also Romanized as Rangrazān-e Soflá; also known as Rangrazān) is a village in Razan Rural District, Zagheh District, Khorramabad County, Lorestan Province, Iran. At the 2006 census, its population was 369, in 70 families.

References 

Towns and villages in Khorramabad County